Lewis Jetta (born 4 May 1989) is an Australian rules footballer who plays for the Swan Districts Football Club in the West Australian Football League (WAFL).

Career

Early career
Jetta played his junior football with Carey Park Junior Football Club, a Bunbury side in the South West Football League (SWFL), before playing for Western Australian Football League (WAFL) club Swan Districts and was a part of the colts premiership in 2007.

He was overlooked in the 2007 AFL Draft and decided to return to his hometown Bunbury to play for Bridgetown Football Club in the Lower South West Football League. After one season with Bridgetown Lewis returned to Swan Districts to play senior football in 2009.

AFL career
Jetta was drafted by Sydney with the 14th selection in the 2009 AFL Draft, which had been traded from Collingwood in exchange for Darren Jolly.

Jetta is a small, but extremely quick and skilful player who was overlooked in both the 2007 and 2008 drafts, before having a breakthrough year for Swan Districts in 2009. He represented Western Australia in their state game against South Australia in June 2009 and kicked three goals, including the WA's last goal in the final minutes. He is the cousin of Neville Jetta who plays for Melbourne and his brother Graham Jetta plays for Swan Districts.

Jetta was impressive against Carlton in the opening round of the 2010 NAB Cup.

In 2010, Jetta's debut season, he scored 19 consecutive behinds without a goal. In round 19, against Hawthorn at the Sydney Cricket Ground, he kicked his first goal late in the game to break his streak and received a standing ovation from the crowd.

Jetta came third in the 2010 AFL Grand Final sprint, representing Sydney.

2011 was a relatively disappointing year for Jetta as he struggled to have an impact in several games. While he was able to have an influence at times throughout the year when he came on as the Swans' substitute, he often found it difficult to find the ball through 4 quarters of football. Although he suffered a disappointing 2011 season, he had an impressive lift of form in the 2012 season. The most notable improvements in his form are improved foot speed, kicking accuracy, and decision making. In 2011, Jetta only managed to kick 9 goals in the entirety of the season, yet by the end of round 16 of the 2012 season, he had kicked 36, making him first for goals in the Sydney squad and seventh in the competition itself. Jetta has improved immensely and has credited this to an outstanding pre-season.

On 8 June 2013 Jetta re-signed with the Sydney Swans for another two seasons.

In October 2015 Jetta was traded to the West Coast Eagles in exchange for Callum Sinclair.

Jetta was delisted at the conclusion of the 2020 AFL season.

Personal life
Jetta and his ex partner Jessica Miller have a son together: Lewis Oliver Miller Jetta, born 26 December 2010. and a daughter, Daisy Ivy Miller Jetta, born 28 August 2013.

Statistics
 Statistics are correct to the end of round 7, 2019

|- style="background-color: #EAEAEA"
! scope="row" style="text-align:center" | 2010
|style="text-align:center;"|
| 32 || 20 || 7 || 21 || 181 || 86 || 267 || 75 || 36 || 0.4 || 1.1 || 9.1 || 4.3 || 13.4 || 3.8 || 1.8
|- 
! scope="row" style="text-align:center" | 2011
|style="text-align:center;"|
| 32 || 20 || 9 || 12 || 132 || 56 || 188 || 45 || 50 || 0.5 || 0.6 || 6.6 || 2.8 || 9.4 || 2.3 || 2.5
|- style="background:#eaeaea;"
|style="text-align:center;background:#afe6ba;"|2012†
|style="text-align:center;"|
| 32 || 25 || 45 || 17 || 278 || 118 || 396 || 84 || 69 || 1.8 || 0.7 || 11.1 || 4.7 || 15.8 || 3.4 || 2.8
|- 
! scope="row" style="text-align:center" | 2013
|style="text-align:center;"|
| 32 || 13 || 10 || 3 || 116 || 38 || 154 || 43 || 37 || 0.8 || 0.2 || 8.9 || 2.9 || 11.8 || 3.3 || 2.8
|- style="background:#eaeaea;"
! scope="row" style="text-align:center" | 2014
|style="text-align:center;"|
| 32 || 25 || 14 || 22 || 311 || 116 || 427 || 107 || 77 || 0.6 || 0.9 || 12.4 || 4.6 || 17.1 || 4.3 || 3.1
|- 
! scope="row" style="text-align:center" | 2015
|style="text-align:center;"|
| 32 || 24 || 14 || 12 || 300 || 138 || 438 || 92 || 75 || 0.6 || 0.5 || 12.5 || 5.8 || 18.3 || 3.8 || 3.1
|- style="background:#eaeaea;"
! scope="row" style="text-align:center" | 2016
|style="text-align:center;"|
| 23 || 12 || 6 || 4 || 98 || 54 || 152 || 39 || 24 || 0.5 || 0.3 || 8.2 || 4.5 || 12.7 || 3.3 || 2.0
|- 
! scope="row" style="text-align:center" | 2017
|style="text-align:center;"|
| 23 || 15 || 9 || 5 || 158 || 81 || 239 || 57 || 33 || 0.6 || 0.3 || 10.5 || 5.4 || 15.9 || 3.8 || 2.2
|- style="background:#eaeaea;"
|style="text-align:center;background:#afe6ba;"|2018†
|style="text-align:center;"|
| 23 || 20 || 1 || 1 || 227 || 101 || 328 || 91 || 32 || 0.1 || 0.1 || 11.4 || 5.1 || 16.4 || 4.6 || 1.6
|- 
! scope="row" style="text-align:center" | 2019
|style="text-align:center;"|
| 23 || 6 || 0 || 0 || 77 || 25 || 102 || 29 || 6 || 0.0 || 0.0 || 12.8 || 4.2 || 17.0 || 4.8 || 1.0
|- class="sortbottom"
! colspan=3| Career
! 180
! 115
! 97
! 1878
! 813
! 2691
! 662
! 439
! 0.6
! 0.5
! 10.4
! 4.5
! 15.0
! 3.7
! 2.4
|}

References

External links

WAFL Online Profile

Sydney Swans players
Sydney Swans Premiership players
Living people
1989 births
Indigenous Australian players of Australian rules football
Swan Districts Football Club players
People from Bunbury, Western Australia
Australian rules footballers from Western Australia
Carey Park Football Club players
West Coast Eagles players
West Coast Eagles Premiership players
Australia international rules football team players
Two-time VFL/AFL Premiership players